The Kirkland Lake Gold Miners are a Junior "A" ice hockey team from Kirkland Lake, Ontario, Canada.  They are a part of the Northern Ontario Junior Hockey League.

History

Manitoulin

Founded in 2003 as the Manitoulin Wild, the franchise changed its name to the Manitoulin Islanders in 2005.  They were eventually taken over by former NHLer Reggie Leach and the team started to split its time between Little Current, Ontario, and the Wiikwemkoong Unceded Reserve's Arena.  With limited community support and win totals dwindling, volunteers were facing burnout and in 2011, direction was given to Team President, Kevin Eshkawkogan to find a buyer for the team from off the Island.

Kirkland Lake
After eight years on Manitoulin Island, the team had to either move or fold.  In mid-May 2011, the NOJHL conditionally approved the move of the Manitoulin Islanders to Kirkland Lake, Ontario to become the Kirkland Lake Blue Devils.  In their final four seasons in Little Current, the Islanders managed 17 wins in 200 games played.

The Blue Devils moniker was a long used traditional team name in Kirkland Lake, the most notable team to use the name was the Kirkland Lake Blue Devils who defeated the Calgary Stampeders 3-games-to-none to win the 1940 Allan Cup.

On September 9, 2011, the Blue Devils played their inaugural home game and regulation game in their history.  The Blue Devils dropped a 9-2 decision to the North Bay Trappers.  On October 12, 2011, the Blue Devils won their first game since relocation 3–2 in a shootout against the Sudbury Cubs.  Two nights later, the Blue Devils scored their first ever home win, 5-4 in a shootout, against the Blind River Beavers.

On January 12, 2012, team owner, Robert Kasner, announced that he was folding the club mid-season.  The folding of the team happened right after Kasner was suspended by the league for six months for multiple roster violations.  Soon after the folding, the league announced that a new ownership group was to be brought in to run the team, keeping the team in Kirkland Lake. The team completed the 2011–12 season under the new name, the Gold Miners.

The Gold Miners won their first NOJHL championship in 2014 when they defeated the Soo Thunderbirds. The Gold Miners then traveled to Wellington, Ontario, to participate in the 2014 Dudley Hewitt Cup where they failed to record a win. In 2014–15, the Gold Miners and the Soo Thunderbirds were fighting for first place all season, but Kirkland Lake finished second and the Powassan Voodoos won the playoff series against Kirkland Lake.

The Kirkland Lake Gold Miners were awarded hosting duties for the 2016 Dudley Hewitt Cup, and lost to the Thunderbirds in the semifinal game.

Season-by-season results

Dudley Hewitt Cup
Central Canada Championships
Winners of the NOJHL, OJHL, SIJHL, and Host
Round robin play with 2nd vs 3rd in semifinal to advance against 1st in the finals.

References

External links
KL Gold Miners Webpage

Kirkland Lake
Northern Ontario Junior Hockey League teams
Ice hockey clubs established in 2003
2003 establishments in Ontario